Sergey or Sergei Abramov may refer to:

 Sergei Abramov (futsal player) (born 1990), Russian futsal player 
 Sergei Abramov (ice hockey, born 1956), Russian ice hockey player and coach
 Sergei Abramov (ice hockey, born 1959), Russian ice hockey player
 Sergei Abramov (ice hockey, born 1993), Russian ice hockey player
 Sergei Abramov (mathematician) (born 1957), Russian mathematician
 Sergey Abramov (politician) (born 1972), Moscow-based executive of Russian Railways and a former politician